Zhusuan (literally: "bead calculation") is the knowledge and practices of arithmetic calculation through the suanpan or Chinese abacus. In the year 2013, it has been inscribed on the UNESCO Representative List of the Intangible Cultural Heritage of Humanity. While deciding on the inscription, the Intergovernmental Committee noted that "Zhusuan is considered by Chinese people as a cultural symbol of their identity as well as a practical tool; transmitted from generation to generation, it is a calculating technique adapted to multiple aspects of daily life, serving multiform socio-cultural functions and offering the world an alternative knowledge system." The movement to get Chinese Zhusuan inscribed in the list was spearheaded by Chinese Abacus and Mental Arithmetic Association.

History
Zhusuan was a abacus invented in China at the end of the 2nd century CE and reached its peak during the period from the 13th to the 16th century CE. In the 13th century, Guo Shoujing (郭守敬) used Zhusuan to calculate the length of each orbital year and found it to be 365.2425 days. In the 16th century, Zhu Zaiyu (朱載堉) calculated the musical Twelve-interval Equal Temperament using Zhusuan. And again in the 16th century, Wang Wensu (王文素) and Cheng Dawei (程大位) wrote respectively Principles of Algorithms and General Rules of Calculation, summarizing and refining the mathematical algorithms of Zhusuan, thus further boosting the popularity and promotion of Zhusuan. At the end of the 16th century, Zhusuan was introduced to neighboring countries and regions.

In culture
Zhusuan is an important part of the traditional Chinese culture. Zhusuan has a far-reaching effect on various fields of Chinese society, like Chinese folk custom, language, literature, sculpture, architecture, etc., creating a Zhusuan-related cultural phenomenon. For example, ‘Iron Abacus’ (鐵算盤) refers to someone good at calculating; ‘Plus three equals plus five and minus two’ (三下五除二; +3 = +5 − 2) means quick and decisive; ‘3 times 7 equals 21’ indicates quick and rash; and in some places of China, there is a custom of telling children's fortune by placing various daily necessities before them on their first birthday and letting them choose one to predict their future lives. Among the items is an abacus, which symbolizes wisdom and wealth.

References

External links

UNESCO video on Chinese Zhusuan on YouTube (Published on Dec 4, 2013): Zhusuan

Abacus
Chinese mathematics
Masterpieces of the Oral and Intangible Heritage of Humanity